Merrill Womach (February 7, 1927 – December 28, 2014) was an American undertaker, organist and gospel singer, notable both for founding National Music Service (now Global Distribution Network, Inc.), which provided recorded music to funeral homes across America, and for surviving a Thursday, November 23, 1961 plane crash in Beaver Marsh, Oregon that left him disfigured with third degree burns on his hands and his entire head.

Womach authorized an autobiography of his recovery titled Tested by Fire, co-authored with his former wife Virginia with help from Mel and Lyla White. A documentary film titled He Restoreth My Soul was also made about Womach's accident and subsequent recovery.

He died in his sleep on December 28, 2014.

Discography
1960 My Song
1967 I Believe in Miracles
1968 Merrill Womach Sings Christmas Carols
1969 A Time For Us
1970 Surely Goodness and Mercy
1973 I Stood At Calvary
1974 Happy Again
1976 Mine Eyes Have Seen The Glory
1977 In Concert
1977 In Quartet
1977 New Life Collectible
1979 Images Of Christmas
1979 My Favorite Hymns
1980 Reborn
1981 Classical
1981 I'm A Miracle, Lord
1981 Merrill
1983 Feelin' Good
1985 Thank You, Lord

References

External links

1927 births
2014 deaths
American gospel singers